The 2009–10 Cruz Azul season was the 50th season in the football club's history and the 46th consecutive season in the top flight of Mexican football. The club participated in the Apertura and Bicentenario tournaments of the Mexican Primera División and in the CONCACAF Champions League.

Coaching staff

Players

Torneo Apertura

Note: Flags indicate national team as has been defined under FIFA eligibility rules. Players may hold more than one non-FIFA nationality.

Transfers

In

Out

Competitions

Overview

Torneo Apertura

League table

Results summary

Result round by round

Torneo Bicentenario

League table

Results summary

Result round by round

Statistics

Goals

Clean sheets

Hat-tricks

Own goals

References

Mexican football clubs 2009–10 season
Cruz Azul seasons